A Jarisch–Herxheimer reaction is a reaction to endotoxin-like products released by the death of harmful microorganisms within the body during antibiotic treatment. Efficacious antimicrobial therapy results in lysis (destruction) of bacterial cell membranes, and in the consequent release into the bloodstream of bacterial toxins, resulting in a systemic inflammatory response.

Jarisch–Herxheimer reactions can be life-threatening as they can cause a significant drop in blood pressure and cause acute end-organ injury, eventually leading to multi-organ failure.

Signs and symptoms
It comprises part of what is known as sepsis and occurs after initiation of antibacterials when treating Gram-negative infections such as Escherichia coli and louse- and tick-borne infections. It usually manifests in 1–3 hours after the first dose of antibiotics as fever, chills, rigor, hypotension, headache, tachycardia, hyperventilation, vasodilation with flushing, myalgia (muscle pain), exacerbation of skin lesions and anxiety. The intensity of the reaction indicates the severity of inflammation. Reaction commonly occurs within two hours of drug administration, but is usually self-limiting.

Causes
The Jarisch–Herxheimer reaction is traditionally associated with antimicrobial treatment of syphilis. The reaction is also seen in the other diseases caused by spirochetes: Lyme disease, relapsing fever, and leptospirosis.  There have been case reports of the Jarisch–Herxheimer reaction accompanying treatment of other infections, including Q fever, bartonellosis, brucellosis, trichinellosis, and African trypanosomiasis.

Pathophysiology
Lipoproteins released from treatment of Treponema pallidum infections are believed to induce the Jarisch–Herxheimer reaction.  The Herxheimer reaction has shown an increase in inflammatory cytokines during the period of exacerbation, including tumor necrosis factor alpha, interleukin-6 and interleukin-8.

Treatments
Prophylaxis and treatment with an anti-inflammatory agent may stop progression of the reaction. Oral aspirin or ibuprofen every four hours for a day or 60 mg of prednisone orally or intravenously has been used as an adjunctive treatment . However, steroids are generally of no benefit. Patients must be closely monitored for the potential complications (collapse and shock) and may require IV fluids to maintain adequate blood pressure. If available, meptazinol, an opioid analgesic of the mixed agonist/antagonist type, should be administered to reduce the severity of the reaction. Anti TNF-α may also be effective.

History
Both Adolf Jarisch, an Austrian dermatologist, and Karl Herxheimer, a German dermatologist, are credited with the discovery of the Jarisch–Herxheimer reaction. Both Jarisch and Herxheimer observed reactions in patients with syphilis treated with mercury.  The reaction was first seen following treatment in early and later stages of syphilis treated with Salvarsan, mercury, or antibiotics. Jarisch thought that the reaction was caused by a toxin released from the dying spirochetes.

See also
 Jarisch-Bezold reflex
 Immune reconstitution inflammatory syndrome, another systemic inflammatory syndrome that arises after antimicrobial treatment

References

External links

Spirochaetes
Symptoms
Complications of surgical and medical care